Jerome Paul Levine (May 4, 1937 – April 8, 2006) was a mathematician who contributed to the understanding of knot theory.

Education and career

Born in New York City, Levine received his B.S. from Massachusetts Institute of Technology in 1958, and his Ph.D. in mathematics from Princeton University in 1962, studying under Norman Steenrod. He began his career as an instructor at M.I.T., after which he spent a year at the University of Cambridge under a National Science Foundation postdoctoral fellowship. He became a professor at the University of California, Berkeley in 1964, and in 1966 he left for Brandeis University. His early work helped to develop surgery as a powerful tool in knot theory and in geometric topology. In 1970 he was an Invited Speaker at the International Congress of Mathematicians in Nice.

Jerome Levine died after a long and hard-fought battle with lymphatic cancer at the age of 68. He was an active mathematician at Brandeis until his death, with his last paper, Labeled binary planar trees and quasi-Lie algebras, published four months after he died.

References

External links

Obituary notice at the American Mathematical Society
Brandeis Justice
 In Memory of Jerry Levine

1937 births
2006 deaths
20th-century American mathematicians
21st-century American mathematicians
Deaths from lymphoma
Scientists from New York City
Topologists
Mathematicians from New York (state)
Princeton University alumni
Massachusetts Institute of Technology alumni
Massachusetts Institute of Technology people
University of California, Berkeley College of Letters and Science faculty
Brandeis University faculty